Moisés Moura Pinheiro (born 25 July 1979) is a Brazilian retired football coach and former player who played as a central defender. He is the current interim head coach of Guarani.

Playing career
Born in Nanuque, Minas Gerais, Moura started his career with Esporte Clube Vitória, gradually becoming a regular for the Série A team and helping it win two consecutive Campeonato Baiano titles. In 2002, he competed with fellow league side Paraná Clube who finished 22nd out of 26 teams, narrowly avoiding relegation.

Moura moved to Russia still in 2002, joining Premier League club FC Spartak Moscow and winning the Russian Cup after defeating FC Rostov 1–0 in the final, with the player playing the full 90 minutes. The following season, as they underperformed in the domestic championship, he was allowed to leave the capital, signing for another side in the country and category, FC Krylia Sovetov Samara, for US$1.9 million.

Initially, things started well for Moura and his new team, who finished a best-ever third in the league and lost the domestic cup final, against FC Terek Grozny. After not being paid for five months, however, he returned to his country and joined Cruzeiro Esporte Clube, where he won the Minas Gerais League and attracted interest from Sporting Clube de Portugal, especially since his contract was about to end; the move was, however, terminated by Lisbon club after a ruling by FIFA concluded that he had been persuaded by Cruzeiro to terminate his contract with Krylia, and he was subsequently banned for four mouths, with the Brazilians not being able to acquire any players for two transfer windows.

After his ban was lifted, Moura would however play parts of the following four seasons in Portugal (two full), notably with S.C. Braga. In 2009–10 he only missed two league games as the Minho club finished in a best-ever second place, adding nine UEFA Champions League appearances in the following campaign (qualifying rounds included); he also played in his country with Clube de Regatas do Flamengo, who loaned him to Boavista F.C. while selling 50% of his economic rights to Cruzeiro.

On 16 January 2011, Moura joined Qatar Stars League side Al Rayyan SC, who paid €1.5 million for his services, split between Braga and Cruzeiro. On 27 December of the following year he returned to his homeland, signing with Associação Portuguesa de Desportos.

Coaching career
After retiring, Moura returned to his former side Braga in 2020, as manager of the under-19 team. On 25 October 2022, he was named head coach of the under-20 category of Guarani.

On 22 February 2023, Moura was confirmed as interim head coach of Bugre, replacing sacked Mozart.

Honours
Vitória
 Campeonato Baiano: 1999, 2000
 Campeonato do Nordeste: 1999

Spartak Moscow
 Russian Cup: 2002–03

Krylia
 Russian Cup: Runner-up 2003–04

Cruzeiro
 Campeonato Mineiro: 2006

Flamengo
 Campeonato Carioca: 2007
 Taça Guanabara: 2007

Braga
 UEFA Europa League: Runner-up 2010–11

Al Rayyan
 Emir of Qatar Cup: 2011

Portuguesa
 Campeonato Paulista Série A2: 2013

References

External links
 
 

1979 births
Living people
Brazilian footballers
Association football defenders
Campeonato Brasileiro Série A players
Esporte Clube Vitória players
Paraná Clube players
Cruzeiro Esporte Clube players
CR Flamengo footballers
Associação Portuguesa de Desportos players
Russian Premier League players
FC Spartak Moscow players
PFC Krylia Sovetov Samara players
Primeira Liga players
Boavista F.C. players
S.C. Braga players
Qatar Stars League players
Al-Rayyan SC players
Chinese Super League players
Shanghai Shenhua F.C. players
Brazilian football managers
Guarani FC managers
Brazilian expatriate footballers
Expatriate footballers in Russia
Expatriate footballers in Portugal
Expatriate footballers in Qatar
Expatriate footballers in China
Brazilian expatriate sportspeople in Russia
Brazilian expatriate sportspeople in Portugal
Brazilian expatriate sportspeople in Qatar
Brazilian expatriate sportspeople in China